Beatrice Giuliani (born 27 November 2002) is an Italian rower twice world champion at junior level at the World Rowing Junior Championships.

Achievements

References

External links
 

2002 births
Living people
Italian female rowers
Rowers from Milan